Walter Joseph Ellis (May 26, 1898January 31, 1980) was a professional American football offensive lineman in the National Football League. He played four seasons for the Columbus Tigers (1924–1925), the Detroit Panthers (1925), and the Chicago Cardinals.

1898 births
1980 deaths
People from Groton, Connecticut
Players of American football from Connecticut
American football offensive tackles
Detroit Titans football players
Columbus Tigers players
Detroit Panthers players
Chicago Cardinals players